The Texas Longhorns football statistical leaders are individual statistical leaders of the Texas Longhorns football program in various categories, including passing, rushing, receiving, total offense, defensive stats, and kicking. Within those areas, the lists identify single-game, single-season, and career leaders. The Longhorns represent the University of Texas in the NCAA's Big 12 Conference.

Although Texas began competing in intercollegiate football in 1893, the school's official record book considers the "modern era" to have begun in 1950. Records from before this year are often incomplete and inconsistent, and they are generally not included in these lists.

These lists are dominated by more recent players for several reasons:
 Since 1950, seasons have increased from 10 games to 11 and then 12 games in length.
 The NCAA didn't allow freshmen to play varsity football until 1972 (with the exception of the World War II years), allowing players to have four-year careers.
 Bowl games only began counting toward single-season and career statistics in 2002. The Longhorns have played in a bowl game in all but four seasons since then, allowing players to have an additional game to accumulate statistics.
 Similarly, the Longhorns have played in the Big 12 Championship Game (1996–2010, 2017–present) six times, providing yet another game for players in those seasons.
 All of the Longhorns' 10 highest seasons in points scored, and all but one of the top 10 seasons in offensive yards, came under former head coach Mack Brown, who coached Texas from 1998 through 2013.
 Due to COVID-19 issues, the NCAA ruled that the 2020 season would not count against the athletic eligibility of any football player, giving everyone who played in that season the opportunity for five years of eligibility instead of the normal four.

These lists are updated through the end of the 2021 season.

Passing

Passing yards

Passing touchdowns

Rushing

Rushing yards

Rushing touchdowns

Receiving

Receptions

Receiving yards

Receiving touchdowns

Total offense
Total offense is the sum of passing and rushing statistics. It does not include receiving or returns.

Total offense yards

Touchdowns responsible for
"Touchdowns responsible for" is the NCAA's official term for combined passing and rushing touchdowns.

Defense

Interceptions

Tackles

Sacks

Kicking

Field goals made

Field goal percentage

References

Texas